Işıklı is a quarter of the town Ardeşen, Ardeşen District, Rize Province, northeastern Turkey. Its population is 598 (2021).

History 
According to list of villages in Laz language book (2009), name of the neighbourhood is Ghere. Most inhabitants of the neighbourhood are ethnically Laz. Işıklı, which was a village until 2015, converted into a neighborhood in 2015.

Geography

References

Populated places in Ardeşen District
Laz settlements in Turkey